Nymphaea nouchali var. caerulea, is a water lily in the genus Nymphaea, a botanical variety of Nymphaea nouchali.

It is an aquatic plant of freshwater lakes, pools and rivers, naturally found throughout most of the eastern half of Africa, as well as parts of southern Arabia, but has also been spread to other regions as an ornamental plant. It was grown by the Ancient Egyptian civilization, and had significance in their religion. It can tolerate the roots being in anoxic mud in nutritionally poor conditions, and can become a dominant plant in deeper water in such habitats. It is associated with a species of snail, which is one of the main hosts of the pathogen causing human schistosomiasis. The underwater rhizomes are edible. Like other species in the genus, the plant contains the psychoactive alkaloid aporphine (not to be confused with apomorphine, a metabolic product of aporphine).

Taxonomy
Nymphaea spectabilis, a purple form known from cultivation, and N. capensis, found throughout eastern, central and southern Africa, as well as a number of other named taxa, were synonymised to N. nouchali var. caerulea in the 1989 addition to the Flora of Tropical East Africa (FTEA) series, a position which has generally been accepted, although some of the authorities in Bangladesh and in the United States disagree.

In 2012 there was a phylogenetic study where N. caerulea was more related to N. gracilis, an endemic of northern Mexico, than it was to N. nouchali. The evolutionary tree was a consensus of ITS2 and matk. According to this study, N. caerulea should not be considered as a variety of N. nouchali. When genomes from the water lily genus (Nymphaea) were published in the journal Nature in 2020, N. caerulea was cited under that name, not as N. nouchali var. caerulea. Another phylogenetic study from 2021 found N. caerulea (as N. capensis) to be closest related to N. colorata, an east African species.

Nymphaea nouchali is itself a taxonomically challenging species, with a distribution that spans Australia, throughout southern Asia, across Africa to the Western Cape. It has many colour forms (with red-coloured forms generally called N. stellata) and has a long history of cultivation. In Africa, following the 1989 FTEA publication, five different varieties are recognised: var. caerulea, the most widespread, ovalifolia, in parts of tropical Southern Africa, petersiana, the same, zanzibarensis, from tropical southern, central and East Africa, and mutandaensis, which is an endemic of Uganda. One of these taxa, var. petersiana, was found to be quite divergent in the 2012 study. If the 2012 study is to be accepted, this may indicate that the African populations of N. nouchali belong to another species than the Asian and Australian type populations, and should likely be renamed N. caerulea as this name has priority over N. capensis.

Classification
It is classified in the Nymphaea subgenus Brachyceras. This subgenus appears to be phylogenetically sound.

Description
This is an aquatic (euhydrophyte) herb with a tuberous rhizome. That is to say, it has small tubers that may develop into short vertical rhizomes. It is a perennial. One plant can spread over an area of about 1 metre.

The leaves are polymorphic, changing in form and texture depending if they are underwater or floating. These laminae have a chartaceous texture and can be glabrous or densely covered in pubescent hairs. The shape is incised-cordate and orbicular or subelliptic, with an acute or caudate apex. The two lobes can overlap somewhat or be slightly apart from each other. The upper surface of the lamina is smooth, but the underside has conspicuously raised, green or rarely reddish or reddish-purple veins. There are eight to eleven primary lateral veins on each side of the midrib. There are six to eight pairs of secondary veins arising from the midrib. The primary veins form a pattern of closed, elongated areas stretching to more than two thirds of the way to the margin of the leaf. The leaf margin is entire towards the apex or more-or-less irregularly sinuate-lobulate throughout its entirety. The petioles are thick, blackish green and spongy. They continue to lengthen as they age, pushing older leaves towards the margins of the plant.

There are 14–20 petals, of which the outermost are as long as the sepals. Their shape is oblong, and their apexes end in blunt or subacute tips. The stamens are densely congested and very numerous, numbering 100–200 or more. The outermost stamens have long appendages. There are 14–24 carpels, with a very short style. There are also carpellary appendages; these are what is known as 'osmophores', structures which serve to attract pollinators without actually rewarding them, thus by deceit. In this case they are visually attractive for bees and exude an odour mimicking food.

The flower buds rise to the surface over a period of two to three days, and when ready, open during the mid-morning, closing near dusk. This ability is controlled by the sepals; when these are cut off, the flower loses the ability to close. The flowers and buds do not rise above the water in the morning, nor do they submerge at night. The flowers last some four days before they start to wither, closing up each night.

The fruit are berries, 2.2 by 3.2 cm and flattened-round in shape. The seeds are ellipsoid and 1.2 mm long. They are smooth, and have a fleshy, bell-shaped aril.

Chemical composition
Apomorphine is said to be main psychoactive compound present. Other compounds include nuciferine.

Similar species
In Southern Africa the only other native species of water-lily is N. lotus; this has night-blooming, usually white flowers. N. mexicana is a mostly yellow-flowered invasive species in South Africa. Most plants are derived from US stock, but a significant number of samples were escaped garden cultivars or hybrids, some of which may be crossed with native species. These hybrids are often recognisable by their divergent flower colours and forms.

In Australia it may be confused with the native N. gigantea, but can be distinguished on the basis of N. gigantea lacking the petal-coloured appendages on the outer stamens in N. caerulea.

Distribution
The native distribution covers North Africa along the Nile and south throughout central, East and Southern Africa. It is common in this range. The conservation status has not been evaluated by the IUCN, but it is considered a species of 'least concern' by the South African National Biodiversity Institute in their Red List of South African Plants.

On the African continent, it occurs, from north to south, westwards to at least Chad, Congo-Brazzaville, the DRC (only in Katanga?), Angola and Namibia. In South Africa this plant is found in every province, as well as in eSwatini, but it is not native to Lesotho and the Western Cape. It also occurs on islands off the eastern African coast: Zanzibar, Madagascar and the Comoro Islands. It is native to Yemen and Oman (in Dhofar) in the southern Arabian Peninsula but, according to Moshe Agami in a 1980 paper, is thought to have become extinct in the wild in Israel. 

It has more recently been spread more widely around the world as an ornamental plant, and introduced populations are now found in Bangladesh, Meghalaya, Kerala and Assam in India, Fiji, Mauritius, North Island in New Zealand, New South Wales and Queensland in Australia, Cook Islands, Costa Rica, and throughout eastern South America (in Brazil and Argentina).

There is an introduced population of blue water-lilies originally from East Africa in the US in the state of Florida. This was first identified as N. zanzibarensis, then as N. capensis var. zanzibarensis, but following the 1989 FTEA publication the taxon was moved to N. nouchali var. zanzibarensis. Nonetheless the 1997 addition to the Flora of North America series decided to retain recognition of the local population under the name N. capensis, and this population continues to be recognised under that name in the US.

The naturalised populations in eastern Australia were also thought to be N. capensis var. zanzibarensis, then later N. caerulea var. zanzibarensis, then in 2011 N. capensis, but the plants in the wild are now thought to be N. caerulea. It is considered an environmental weed in Australia.

Ecology
It has a habitat consisting of rivers, lakes and pools.

Although in cultivation it is said to be quite demanding of nutrients, in the quite nutrient-poor Lake Nabugabo in Uganda it is the dominant aquatic plant species, only being replaced by N. lotus in the eastern tip of the lake, and other aquatic genera where it is more shallow. The dense monospecific stands are associated with an Utricularia sp. and Nymphoides indica in one part of the lake, and with Ceratophyllum demersum in certain other bays. The waterlily stands in this lake are especially poor in invertebrate biodiversity, which may reflect the low levels of dissolved oxygen near the sediments in this habitat. In Lake Bisina, Uganda, N. caerulea is most clearly associated with Utricularia reflexa; this may be due to similar ecological niches, it may just mean the small, rootless, free-moving Utricularia simply get snagged on the petioles, but it may indicate some sort of a commensal relationship, with U. reflexa being shaded by the leaves of N. caerulea. Hydrilla verticillata is another plant which seems to sometimes occur together with the waterlily in this lake, as well as in Lake Bunyonyi.

Pollination is entomophilous. In Kirstenbosch Botanical Gardens, South Africa, the flowers are visited by honey bees. In fact, the carpellary appendages in this type of water-lily appear to have evolved specifically to attract bee species in general. In a way, these waterlilies are parasites of the services of bees, attracting the insects by deceit, without actually rewarding them for their labours. In India plants bloom and fruit from May to October.

The fruit suddenly bursts when ripe, and the scattered seed float away. The seed soon sinks. Seeds often make it to the river's edge or lake shore, and can build up a significant seedbank here. These seeds only germinate when heavy rains flood the banks, and they are submerged under a layer of water. In cultivation, the plants take three to four years to flower from seed. In colder climates, the plants lose their leaves and go dormant during the winter, with the rhizomes remaining alive below the water.

Gomphonema gracile is an epiphytic diatom found on N. caerulea in high elevation Lake Naivasha, Kenya. In Kenya, N. caerulea is positively associated with the freshwater snail Biomphalaria pfeifferi, which is a main host of human schistosomiasis. The edible American crayfish Procambarus clarkii eliminates the mollusc, as well as feeding on the water-lily. The crayfish was first introduced to Kenya in 1966 as a species with which to enhance the local fisheries. In Lake Naivasha, N. caerulea was extremely common until the 1970s, and there is still a seedbank around the shores of the lake. Procambarus clarkii was introduced to the lake in 1970, and now supports an annual harvest of a few thousand kilograms, but it may have been responsible for eliminating not only the water-lily in the main lake by 1983, but all native aquatic plant species in this water body. It is not the only potential culprit; invasive mats of exotic floating vegetation have also taken over the lake, two different commercially fishable fish species have been introduced, and the new fisheries upon these three species could all be responsible, or a combination.

Uses
The rootstock of the blue water lily was collected and eaten in western South Africa around 1800, either raw or in curries, in particular by the Cape Malays and farming communities in the Cape, although this practice has now died out.

Some evidence indicates the effects of plants including N. caerulea that contain the psychoactive alkaloid aporphine were known to both the Maya and the Ancient Egyptians. The mildly sedating effects of N. caerulea makes it a candidate (among several) for the fruit of the lotus tree eaten by the mythical Lotophagi in Homer's Odyssey.

This lotus has been used to produce perfumes since ancient times; it is also used in aromatherapy.

Cultivation
It is grown as an ornamental plant for water gardens in tropical to subtropical regions around the world. It is easy to grow in ponds in any part of Southern Africa, including the highveld, and is hardy to -1 °C.

'Valentina's Pale Blue Eyes' is a registered cultivar of this species from 2018, bred in Italy partially from a clone known as 'Rwanda'.

Religion and art

Along with the white lotus, Nymphaea lotus, also native to Egypt, the plant and flower are very frequently depicted in Ancient Egyptian art. They have been depicted in numerous stone carvings and paintings, including the walls of the temple of Karnak, and may be associated with rites pertaining to the afterlife. A number of pharaohs' mummies were covered with the petals of the flower. There are indications it was grown in special farms over 4,000 years ago to produce enough flowers for votive offerings, although it was apparently also simply grown as an ornamental in traditional Egyptian garden ponds. N. caerulea was considered extremely significant in Egyptian mythology, regarded as a symbol of the sun, since the flowers are closed at night and open again in the morning. At Heliopolis, the origin of the world was taught to have been when the sun god Ra emerged from a lotus flower growing in "primordial waters". At night, he was believed to retreat into the flower again. Due to its colour, it was identified, in some beliefs, as having been the original container, in a similar manner to an egg, of Atum, and in similar beliefs Ra, both solar deities. As such, its properties form the origin of the "lotus variant" of the Ogdoad cosmogeny. It was the symbol of the Egyptian deity Nefertem.

Legal issues
Nymphaea caerulea is illegal in Latvia since November 2009. It is a schedule 1 drug. Possession of quantities up to 1 gram are fined up to 280 euros, for second offences within a year period criminal charges are applied. Possession of larger quantities can be punished by up to 15 years in prison. The plant was banned in Poland in March 2009. Possession and distribution lead to a criminal charge. N. caerulea is illegal in Russia since April 2009 along with related products such as Salvia divinorum, Argyreia nervosa and others.

See also
List of plants known as lotus
Fleur-de-lis
Nymphaea capensis, cape blue water lily
Nymphaea lotus, the Egyptian white water lily
Nymphaea nouchali, the star lotus, in Sanskrit utpala
Palmette
Sacred Weeds, a Channel 4 TV series examining the effects of various psychoactive plants (including the blue lily) on volunteers
 List of plants known as lily

Notes

References

External links

 Erowid Vault about Blue Lotus

Entheogens
caerulea
Flora of Africa
Flora of Asia